The Chengdu Metro is the rapid transit system of Chengdu, the capital of Sichuan, China. With the opening of Line 1 on 27 September 2010, the system consists of 12 subway lines and 1 light rail line. It has subsequently undergone rapid expansion. Since the opening of Lines 6, 8, 9, and 17 on 18 December 2020, the Chengdu Metro is the 4th longest metro system in the world.

There are currently 12 operating subway lines totaling  of track, and 1 tram line (Line T2). The Chengdu Metro serves over 8 million trips per day. As of 2021, about 2.2 million and 4.6 million people live within  of a subway station in Chengdu, respectively.

Operating network

Line 1

The first phase of Line 1 cost 7 billion yuan to construct. A natural ventilation system has been used in the underground section of Line 1 on the subway system from Southern Third Ring Road to Jincheng Plaza Station. Square ventilation units are built every  along the subway top to allow fresh air from the ground enter the construction site underground. The method is used in subway construction in other countries as it cuts the construction cost and it saves energy. The subway system is the first in China to adopt such a ventilation system during construction. Chengdu Metro is planning to set up a section for subway fire control and introduce the latest fire fighting technologies and vehicles. Line 1's color is dark blue.

Line 2

Line 2 is a crosstown northwest–southeast trunk route. This line serves the Chengdu East railway station. Line 2 began operation on 16 September 2012. Line 2's color is orange.

Line 3 

Line 3 runs in a northeast–southwest direction from Chengdu Medical College to Shuangliu West Station. Phase 1 of this line began construction on 28 April 2012, and opened on 31 July 2016. It was Chengdu's final line to use the lower capacity type B trains, subsequent lines favoring the longer and wider Type A cars. Line 3's color is magenta.

Line 4 

Line 4 is the third line to enter revenue service on the metro network in Chengdu, Sichuan. Line 4 runs in an east–west direction, stretching from Wansheng in Wenjiang to Xihe in the Longquanyi. The first phase started construction on 22 July 2011, and began operation on 26 December 2015. Testing began on the east of west extensions of Line 4 as part of Phase II expansion on 10 December 2016. Line 4's color is green.

Line 5

Line 5 is a crosstown north–south trunk line. Despite being numbered such, it was the seventh line to open, having started operation on 27 December 2019. Line 5's color is purple.

Line 6 

Line 6 is a crosstown northwest–south-west pivotal line. It has more stations than any other metro line in China, with 54 currently plus two more infill stations coming later. It is one of the four lines to have started operation on 18 Dec 2020. Line 6's color is brown.

Line 7 

Line 7 is a  loop line which runs around downtown Chengdu. Despite the number, it was actually the sixth line to open, having started operation on 6 December 2017. Line 7's color is sky blue.

Line 8 

Line 8 is a  crosstown northeast–southwest filling line. Phase 1 started operation on 18 Dec 2020, the same day as lines 6, 9, and 18. Line 8's color is chartreuse.

Line 9 

Line 9 will be the system's second circle line when it is completed. It is the first driverless metro line in Mid/West China. Phase 1 started operation on 18 Dec 2020. Line 9's color is bright orange.

Line 10 

Line 10 is a  line serving Chengdu Shuangliu International Airport. It started operation on 6 September 2017. It was also the first line to use the higher-capacity type A trains. Line 10's color is blue.

Line 17 

Line 17 is a  express line at west side of Chengdu. Phase 1, including phase 1 of line 19, started operation on 18 Dec 2020. Like line 18 is uses a special variant of Type A trains with one less door per side and using 25 kV AC overhead power, as opposed to the "standard" 1500 V DC most newer metros in China use. Line 17's color is pale green.

Line 18 

Line 18 is the first express subway line in the city. It parallels the southern section of Line 1 serving Tianfu New Area. It started operation on 27 September 2020. Phase 2 started operation on 18 Dec 2020. At , it is the third longest metro line in China after Chongqing Line 6 in second place and Shanghai Line 11 being the longest. It is still however the longest line that does not have any branches. Like line 17 is uses a special variant of Type A trains with one less door per side and using 25 kV AC overhead power. Line 18's color is teal.

Tram Line 2 

Chengdu Tram Line 2 has  of operating tracks and 35 stations (47 when fully completed). The line uses low-floor trams derived from the Alstom Citadis. Tram Line 2's color is light green.

History

Inception 
In 1985, the Chengdu Planning Bureau set up an integrated transportation planning office which began the process of the planning for a rapid transit network for Chengdu. By 1992, a proposal for the subway was sent to the National Planning Commission and was subsequently rejected. In 2004 before the approval of the National Development and Reform Commission Chengdu started reconstructing Tianfu Square with provisions for Tianfu Square station. The first phase of Chengdu Metro, consisting of Lines 1 and 2, were approved by the NDRC on 11 September 2005.

First Phase Projects

2005
Line 1 started construction on 28 December 2005.

2007
 Line 2 began construction on 29 December 2007.

2009
 In May 2009 the NDRC approved the addition of a western and eastern extensions of Line 2, and approved the first phase of Lines 3 and 4 in Phase 1.

2010
 Line 1 opened on 27 September 2010.

2011
 Construction of the first phase of Line 4 started construction on 22 July 2011.

2012
 On 25 April 2012, Line 3 was approved by the Development and Reform Commission.
 On 16 January 2012, the National Development and Reform Commission officially approved the southern extension of Line 1.
 On 28 April 2012, Line 3 started construction.

2013
 On 8 June 2013, Line 2 West Extension to Xipu, and Ocean Park Station on Line 1 was opened. Ocean Park was then renamed to Jincheng Plaza.

2014
 On 26 October 2014, Line 2 East Extension to Longquanyi opened.

2015
 On 25 July 2015, Line 1 South Extension was opened.
 On 10 December 2015, Line 4 Phase 1 was opened.

2016
 On 31 July 2016, Line 3 Phase 1 was opened marking the completion of the first phase.

Second Phase Projects

2009
 In May 2009, the NDRC approved the second phase of expansion for the Chengdu Metro consisting Line 1 Phase 3, Line 3 Phase 2 and 3, Line 4 Phase 2, Line 5 Phase 1 and 2, Line 6 Phase 1, Line 7, Line 10 Phase 1, and Line 18.

2014
On 4 June 2014, Line 10 Phase 1 started construction.

2015
In August 2015, Line 5 Phase 1 started construction.

2017
On 28 February 2017, Line 18's first tunnel boring machine was launched.
 On 2 June 2017, Line 4 Phase 2 was opened.
 On 6 September 2017, Line 10 phase 1 was opened.
 On 6 December 2017, Line 7 was opened.

2018
 On 18 March 2018, Line 1 Phase 3 was opened.
 On 26 December 2018, Line 3 Phase 2 and 3 was opened.

2019
In November 2019, Chengdu Metro started to use new signage branding with the opening of Line 5.
 On 27 December 2019, Line 5 and Line 10 Phase 2 was opened.

2020
On 2 June 2020, Line 18, the biggest PPP project in China, started its 3-month trial operation in preparation for opening.
On 27 May 2020, Line 6 begins testing.
On 6 August 2020, Line 18 completed fire-prevention assessment.
On 27 September 2020, Line 18 Phase 1 opened.
On 18 Dec 2020, Line 6 Phase 1/2/3, Line 8 Phase 1, Line 9 Phase 1, Line 17 Phase 1, Line 18 Phase 2 opened. Marking the completion of Phase 2 and 3 projects.
In 2020, with the opening of Line 6, Line 18 and other lines, Chengdu Metro refreshed the wayfinding in all stations with alpha-numeric station identifiers. In addition, new LCD passenger information systems, such as "comprehensive information screen" LCD, in station concourses and on screen doors at some stations.

Third Phase Projects 

 On 11 July 2016, the NDRC approved the third phase of expansion for the Chengdu Metro consisting of Line 6 phase 2 and 3, Line 8, Line 9, Line 10 Phase 2, Line 17 Phase 1 and Line 18. The third phase was to be simultaneously built with the already under construction second phase.
 On 31 December 2016, Lines 8, 9 and the second phase of Line 10 started construction.
 On 16 August 2016, Line 18 started construction.
 On 27 February 2017, Line 17 Phase 1 started construction.
 On 19 February 2019, Line 9's first train was delivered from CRRC Changchun Railway Vehicles. It is Chengdu's the first ever subway train capable of GoA4 ATO.
 On 30 July 2019, the TBM finished tunneling between Chengdu West Railway to Huangtianba Stations, completing tunneling for Line 9.
 On 5 August 2019, all stations on Line 17 Phase 1 completed construction of main structure and roofing.
 On 14 January 2020, the last section of track was laid between Sanyuan Station to Jincheng Avenue Station, completing track work for all of Line 9 Phase 1.
 On 11 April 2020, Chengdu Metro reported that track-laying for Line 8 was completed.
 On 19 June 2020, Line 9 and Line 17 both started 3-month trial operations.
 On 24 June 2020, Construction finished for Wutongmiao Temple Depot (五桐庙停车场) for Line 17.
 On 8 July 2020, Line 6 Phase 1 and 2 was officially powered on.
 On 8 August 2020, Line 8's whole line power network passed quality assessment.
 On 18 Dec 2020, Line 6 Phase 1/2/3, Line 8 Phase 1, Line 9 Phase 1, Line 17 Phase 1, Line 18 Phase 2 opened. Marking the completion of Phase 2 and 3 projects and making the Chengdu Metro the 4th largest subway system in the world with over 500 km of operating subway route after 15 years of breakneck growth.

Fourth Phase Projects 

 On 17 June 2019, the NDRC approved the fourth phase expansion for the Chengdu Metro. It consists of Line 8 Phase 2, Line 10 Phase 3, Line 13 Phase 1, Line 17 Phase 2, Line 18 Phase 3, Line 19 Phase 2, Line 27 Phase 1, Line 30 Phase 1.
 On 18 March 2020, construction started on Line 8 Phase 2, Line 19 Phase 2, Line 27 Phase 1, and Line 30 Phase 1.
 On 11 April 2020, construction started on Line 10 Phase 3, Line 13 Phase 1, Line 17 Phase 2, Line 18 Phase 3, and Line 19 Phase 2.
 On 17 July 2020, construction officially started for the 4 stations on Line 30 in Longquanyi District.

Network expansion

Lines under construction 

In 2017, the construction of the first phases of Lines 8, 9, 11, 17 and Line 10 (Phase 2) started, the length of subway under construction in Chengdu totaling . It is expected by the end of 2020, Lines 6, 8, 9, 17 and 18 will open.

Long Term Planning 
In December 2020, Chengdu Municipal Bureau of Planning and Natural Resources announced the long-term planning including Lines 1-33, D1-D6 and S1-S19.

Fares

Single Ride Card 
Single Ride Card is an IC card for one trip. Riders can purchase it through attendants in station's Service Centers or use ticket-vending machines. One ticket allows only one rider in with validity of the same day. If riders have not used the Single Ride Card, they may refund it at the same day at the same station.

From its opening until 1 June 2017, Chengdu Metro used a fare system based on station counts. With a 2-hour grace period in the subway system. In October 2016, Chengdu Metro held public meeting for price changing issues and set new pricing plans.

From 2 June 2017, Chengdu Metro starts new fare system based on distance.

Reloadable IC cards 

The Tianfutong Pass is a reloadable IC Card accepted by the Chengdu Metro. Normal Tianfutong Passes provide 10% discounts. Student Tianfutong Passes provide 50% discounts. Senior Tianfutong Passes have special discounts depending on time of use. Additionally, passengers can pay for single rides directly using Debit IC cards offered by participating banks.

Train Types and Technology 

All "standard" Chengdu Metro lines in operation run on 1,500 V DC supplied by overhead lines. Express lines meanwhile run on 25 kV AC to get to top speed quicker. Trains on Lines 3, 4, 7, 10 and some of the newer Line 2 trains have a Golden Sun Bird insignia. New trains are equipped with LCD passenger information systems.

Signaling System 
All Chengdu Metro lines are equipped with CBTC. Chengdu Metro Line 1, which opened to traffic in 2010, used a CBTC signaling system provided by Zhejiang Zhonghe Technology, a subsidiary of Zhejiang University, in collaboration with Ansaldo STS. This system is also used on Chengdu Metro Line 6 and 10. Chengdu Metro Line 3, which opened in 2016, was one of the first adoptions of a domestic CBTC signal system implementation by Beijing Traffic Control Technology. Beijing Traffic Control Technology's CBTC system is also used in Line 5. Alstom's Urbalis 888 CBTC signal system in collaboration with CASCO is used on Line 18, 19, Chengdu Light Rail Line 2 and the fully automated GoA4 Line 9.

Type A Trains 
In response to congestion and high ridership, Lines 7, 8 and 10 are equipped with higher capacity 6-car aluminum alloy Type A trains. The capacity of a 6-car train is 1,828 passengers with a crush load capacity of 2,488 passengers. Line 7 trains are designed and managed by CRRC Qingdao Sifang with CRRC Chengdu performing manufacturing and assembly. Lines 5, 6 and 9 are equipped with even higher capacity eight car aluminum alloy Type A trains. The capacity of an eight car trainset is 2,480 passengers with a crush load capacity of 3,456 passengers.

Type B Trains 
The capacity of each train set is 1,460 people with a crush load capacity of 1,880 passengers. Lines 1 and 2 use CRRC Qingdao Sifang and CRRC Chengdu trains. Trains on Line 3 and 4 are manufactured by CRRC Changchun Railway Vehicles and CRRC Chengdu. In 2008, Chengdu Metro in anticipation of the opening of Line 1, purchased and initial order of 17 six car trains sets from CRRC Qingdao Sifang. In April 2011, a further order was announced for trains from CRRC for Line 2, taking the total to 59 six car sets.

Light Rail Trains 
Currently, only Chengdu Light Rail Line 2 is in operation. Light Rail Line 2 uses low floor light rail trains provided by domestic manufacturer CRRC. The tram system uses light rail trains, of each having 5 cars and 8 doors. Chengdu Light Rail Line R2 opened to public on 26 December 2018 and extended on 27 December 2019. In early 2020, this line is included in the latest Chengdu Metro's official system map.

Other rail transit

High-speed intercity rail
There are also two high-speed intercity railways in Chengdu, not part of Chengdu Metro system: the Chengdu–Dujiangyan intercity railway and Chengdu–Pujiang intercity railway. They are operated by Chengdu Metropolitan Railway Company Limited, which is China's first joint venture between a local government and China's national rail operator. The city and the Ministry of Railways worked together in building high-speed intercity rail lines.

Network map

See also
 List of metro systems

Notes

References

External links

Chengdu Metro Official Website 
Chengdu Metro on Urbanrail

 
Rapid transit in China
Transport in Sichuan
2010 establishments in China
Railway lines opened in 2010
Projects established in 1985
1500 V DC railway electrification
25 kV AC railway electrification